Blitzkrieg Over You!: A Tribute to the Ramones is a European Ramones tribute album, released in 1998 by Nasty Vinyl, a German record company.  Various Ramones songs covered by artists from around the world were included in this release, as well as some originals, the most famous originals being from Motörhead and Nina Hagen.  Joey Ramone and Dee Dee Ramone both appear on the album.  Many of the tribute songs were recorded in the artists native languages, including German and Finnish, like the German Punk-legends  Die Ärzte and Die Toten Hosen.

Track listing

Ramones tribute albums
1998 compilation albums